Frederick Thomas James French (17 April 1911 – 2 May 1989) was a New Zealand rugby union and professional rugby league footballer who played in the 1930s and 1940s.

Playing career

Challenge Cup Final appearances
French played , and scored a goal in Barrow's 4–7 defeat by Salford in the 1938 Challenge Cup Final during the 1937–38 season at Wembley, London on Saturday 7 May 1938.

County Cup Final appearances
French played , and kicked two conversions in Barrow's 4–8 defeat by Warrington in the 1937 Lancashire County Cup Final during the 1937–38 season at Central Park, Wigan, on Saturday 23 October 1937.

Club career
French played  in Warrington's 30–9 victory over Leigh on 30 November 1935, in his only match for Warrington.

References

External links
Search for "French" at rugbyleagueproject.org
Statistics at wolvesplayers.thisiswarrington.co.uk

1911 births
1989 deaths
Barrow Raiders players
New Zealand rugby league players
New Zealand rugby union players
Place of birth unknown
Rugby league centres
Rugby league fullbacks
Warrington Wolves players